Malcolm "Mal" Dixon (born 2 December 1939) is an English former professional rugby league footballer who played in the 1950s, 1960s and 1970s, and coached in the 1970s. He played at representative level for Great Britain, England and Yorkshire, and at club level for Featherstone Rovers (Heritage № 385) (two spells) (captain and vice-captain) and York (two spells), as an occasional goal-kicking , i.e. number 8 or 10, during the era of contested scrums, and coached at club level for York.

Background
Malcolm Dixon was born in Normanton, West Riding of Yorkshire, England, his birth was registered in Lower Agbrigg, Wakefield, West Riding of Yorkshire, England.

Playing career

International honours
Mal Dixon won a cap for England while at Featherstone Rovers in 1970 against Wales, and won caps for Great Britain while at Featherstone Rovers in 1962 against France, and in 1964 against France.

County honours
Mal Dixon won a cap for Yorkshire while at Featherstone Rovers; during the 1960–61 season against Cumberland.

Challenge Cup Final appearances
Mal Dixon played right-, i.e. number 10, in Featherstone Rovers' 17–12 victory over Barrow in the 1966–67 Challenge Cup Final during the 1966–67 season at Wembley Stadium, London on Saturday 13 May 1967, in front of a crowd of 76,290.

County Cup Final appearances
Mal Dixon played right-, i.e. number 10, in Featherstone Rovers' 15–14 victory over Hull F.C. in the 1959–60 Yorkshire County Cup Final during the 1959–60 season at Headingley Rugby Stadium, Leeds on Saturday 31 October 1959, played right- in the 0–10 defeat by Halifax in the 1963–64 Yorkshire County Cup Final during the 1963–64 season at Belle Vue, Wakefield on Saturday 2 November 1963, and played left-, i.e. number 8, in the 12–25 defeat by Hull Kingston Rovers in the 1966–67 Yorkshire County Cup Final during the 1966–67 season at Headingley Rugby Stadium, Leeds on Saturday 15 October 1966.

Notable tour matches
Mal Dixon played in the combined Castleford and Featherstone Rovers teams' match against New Zealand at Wheldon Road, Castleford.

Club career
Mal Dixon made his début for Featherstone Rovers on Saturday 28 September 1957, he appears to have scored no drop-goals (or field-goals as they are currently known in Australasia), but prior to the 1974–75 season all goals, whether; conversions, penalties, or drop-goals, scored 2-points, consequently prior to this date drop-goals were often not explicitly documented, therefore '0' drop-goals may indicate drop-goals not recorded, rather than no drop-goals scored.

Testimonial match
Mal Dixon's benefit season/testimonial match at Featherstone Rovers took place during the 1967–68 season.

Coaching career

County Cup Final appearances
Malcolm Dixon was the coach in York's 8–18 defeat by Bradford Northern in the 1978 Yorkshire County Cup Final during the 1978–79 season at Headingley Rugby Stadium, Leeds on Saturday 28 October 1978, this was York's first major final since the 1936–37 Yorkshire County Cup Final, a period of 39 years, 2017 marked 39 years since the 1978 Yorkshire County Cup Final, meaning this was York's only major final in the last 78 years.

Honoured at Featherstone Rovers
Malcolm Dixon is a Featherstone Rovers Hall of Fame inductee.

References

External links

1941 births
Living people
England national rugby league team players
English rugby league coaches
English rugby league players
Featherstone Rovers captains
Featherstone Rovers players
Great Britain national rugby league team players
Rugby league players from Wakefield
Rugby league props
York Wasps coaches
York Wasps players
Yorkshire rugby league team players